The National Youth Pipe Band of Scotland is a youth pipe band headed by Steven Blake, consisting of over 100 members who teach and perform around the British isles. The band was founded in 2003 as part of the National Piping Centre in Glasgow and features pipers and drummers between the ages of ten and twenty five. Their structure currently consists of two bands, the Senior Band and the Development Band.

The Senior Band is led by Pipe Majors Calum Brown and Ciaren Ross and Drum Sergeant Ryan Green.

The Development Band is led by Pipe Majors Danny Hutcheson & Kenneth Macfarlane, and Drum Sergeant Rachel Thom.

In 2010 they recorded the official soundtrack for the handover of the Commonwealth Games from Delhi to Glasgow. In 2012 they performed for Queen Elizabeth II on her receipt of the keys to the city of Perth.

In 2017, the band made pipe band history by being the first full pipe band ensemble to perform the infamous "Thunderstruck" suite by Gordon Duncan, at their concert of the same name.

Former members of the band include BBC Radio Scotland Young Traditional Musician finalist Pipe Major Ross Miller.

References

Scottish pipe bands